Billinge and Winstanley is an area in the Metropolitan Borough of Wigan, Greater Manchester, England.  The area, which consists of small settlements and surrounding countryside, includes eleven listed buildings that are recorded in the National Heritage List for England.  Of these, three are listed at Grade II*, the middle of the three grades, and the others are at Grade II, the lowest grade.  Most of the listed buildings are houses and associated structures, the others being monuments and a set of stocks.


Key

Buildings

References

Citations

Sources

Lists of listed buildings in Greater Manchester